Biliūnai Manor is a residential manor near Girkalnis in Raseiniai District Municipality. Currently it is occupied by heiress Bernadeta Elena Kaminskaitė-Žagarnauskienė.

References

Manor houses in Lithuania
Baroque architecture in Lithuania